The 2020 TCR Italy Touring Car Championship will be the sixth season of the ITCC to run under TCR regulations and the 34rd season since the national touring car series was revived in 1987 as the Campionato Italiano Turismo.

Teams and drivers

Calendar and results 
The calendar was announced in December but due to the COVID-19 pandemic has been postponed to a date yet to be decided.

Drivers' Championship 

Scoring systems

References

External links 

 

2020 in Italian motorsport
Italy Touring Car Championship